Ajomojo (possibly from Quechua aqu sand, muqu, hill, "sand hill") is a mountain in the Andes of Peru, about  high. It is located in the Cuzco Department, Canchis Province, Pitumarca District. Ajomojo lies northwest of Intijahuana and east of Huampuni. It is situated at the bank of the Yanamayu, a left tributary of the Chillcamayu whose waters flow to the Vilcanota River.

References

Mountains of Peru
Mountains of Cusco Region